Emili Josep García Miramontes (born 11 January 1989) is an Andorran international footballer. He currently plays as a defender for Inter Club d'Escaldes. García made his international debut in 2008.

International career
García made his senior international debut on 4 June 2008 in a 2-1 friendly defeat to Azerbaijan.

References

External links

1989 births
FC Andorra players
Living people
Andorran footballers
Andorra international footballers
Racing Lermeño players
Association football defenders